Shwe Zin Latt (born 1 September 1985) is a Burmese rower. She competed for Myanmar in the single sculls race at the 2012 Summer Olympics and placed 4th in Final E, and therefore last in the race.

References

External links
 

1985 births
Living people
Burmese  female rowers
Olympic rowers of Myanmar
Rowers at the 2008 Summer Olympics
Rowers at the 2012 Summer Olympics
Southeast Asian Games silver medalists for Myanmar
Southeast Asian Games gold medalists for Myanmar
Southeast Asian Games bronze medalists for Myanmar
Southeast Asian Games medalists in rowing
Rowers at the 2018 Asian Games
Competitors at the 2007 Southeast Asian Games
Asian Games competitors for Myanmar
Competitors at the 2021 Southeast Asian Games